Kabooter Khana is a landmark in Dadar Mumbai.

References 

Dovecotes
Culture of Mumbai